Yaeum-Jangsaengpo-dong is a dong, or neighborhood, of Nam-gu in Ulsan, South Korea. 

Originally Yaeum 1-Jangsaengpo-dong, the neighborhood was renamed in 2007.

See also
Yaeum market
South Korea portal

References

External links
Ulsan Namgu home page

Nam District, Ulsan
Neighbourhoods in South Korea